Haseman is a surname. Notable people with the surname include:

Chris Haseman (born 1969), Australian mixed martial artist
Joseph K. Haseman, American toxicologist known for Haseman–Elston regression
Mary Gertrude Haseman (1889–1979), American mathematician
Vicki Brown (born Victoria Mary Haseman, 1940–1991), British singer
William D. Haseman (died 2019), American computer scientist

See also
Hageman (surname)